Ullim (울림) is a family of Android-based tablet computers sold in North Korea by Pyongyang Informatics Company since 2014.

History 
The Ullim-tablets were first made available in 2014, running a modified version of Android. Among the apps on it, were a few games, e-books, dictionaries, and a cooking app. The tablet PC can access intranet through Wi-Fi.

References

See also
Samjiyon tablet computer
Tablet computers introduced in 2014
Information technology in North Korea